Shirgaon may refer to:

 Shirgaon (Mawal), village in Pune district, Maharashtra, India
 Shirgaon, Ratnagiri, Maharashtra, India
 Shirgaon, Sangli, Maharashtra, India
 Shirgaon, Solapur, Maharashtra, India
 Shirgaon Fort, Palghar, Maharashtra, India
 Shirgaon Census Town,  Palghar, Maharashtra, India

See also
Shiragaon, village in Karnataka, India